Clement or Clément may refer to:

People
 Clement (name), a given name and surname
 Saint Clement (disambiguation)#People

Places 
 Clément, French Guiana, a town
 Clement, Missouri, U.S.
 Clement Township, Michigan, U.S.

Other uses
 Adolphe Clément-Bayard French industrialist (1855–1928), founder of a number of companies which incorporate the name "Clément", including:
 Clément Cycles, French bicycle and motorised cycle manufacturer
 Clément Motor Company, British automobile manufacturer and importer
 Clément Tyres, Franco-Italian cycle tyre manufacturer, licensed in America since 2010
 First Epistle of Clement, of the New Testament apocrypha
 Clément (film), a 2001 French drama

See also 

 Clemens, a name
 Clemente, a name
 Clements (disambiguation)
 Clementine (disambiguation)
 Klement, a name
 Kliment, a name
 San Clemente (disambiguation)